State Road 524 (NM 524) is a  state highway in the US state of New Mexico. NM 524's southern terminus is at US 62, US 180 and US 285 in Carlsbad, and the northern terminus is at U.S. Route 285 (US 285) northwest of Carlsbad.

Major intersections

See also

References

524
Transportation in Eddy County, New Mexico
Carlsbad, New Mexico